John Aloysius O’Mara (17 November 1924 – 16 February 2022) was an American-born Canadian Roman Catholic prelate.

O’Mara was born in Buffalo, Erie County, New York, United States, and was ordained to the priesthood for the Roman Catholic Archdiocese of Toronto, Canada. He served as the bishop of the Roman Catholic Diocese of Thunder Bay, Canada, from 1976 to 1991 and as bishop of the Roman Catholic Diocese of Saint Catharines, Canada, from 1991 until his retirement in 2002. O’Mara died on 16 February 2022, at the age of 97.

References

1924 births
2022 deaths
20th-century Roman Catholic bishops in Canada
21st-century Roman Catholic bishops in Canada
People from Buffalo, New York